WhatIfSports.com is a company based in Cincinnati, Ohio, U.S. that specializes in online sports simulations and fantasy-style games.  It uses custom sports simulators to allow users to match teams from any era and generate a complete play-by-play of a game. Simulations can be run for free, or users can build custom teams consisting of players from any generation and join leagues with their friends for a fee. Results are based on each player's combined stats from previous seasons.

The site won the 2005 Webby award as the best sports website and claims more than 600,000 users as of 2009.

Company history
Founded in 1999, WhatIfSports was a side project of a couple of sports fans working for a computer consulting company in Cincinnati, Ohio. After numerous lunchroom debates on which great historical baseball teams would win if they could play each other, a few guys decided to up the ante.  At the height of the dot-com bubble, they decided to undertake the challenge of trying to write an advanced baseball simulator (along the lines of Strat-O-Matic and APBA) that would work on a website.

An early version of the baseball simulator was up and running by fall of 1999.  The next project was college basketball.  Just in time for March Madness in spring of 2000, the college basketball simulator went online.  This caught the attention of the local media when the simulator said the University of Cincinnati would have made the Final Four if one of its players, power forward Kenyon Martin, had not broken his leg.

While continuing with the consulting work to pay the bills, WhatIfSports remained a side project until the company landed its first major license with Major League Baseball in 2001. The license put the baseball simulator on MLB.com and put WhatIfSports on the map.

In the years that followed, the WhatIfSports project began earning more money than the computer consulting work, as more and more companies began trimming back their information technology budgets.  In 2003 WhatIfSports was officially incorporated; a growing staff was able to introduce new simulators for football, NBA basketball, hockey, and stock car racing.

After two more years of continuous growth, WhatIfSports was acquired by Fox Interactive Media in the fall of 2005. This was around the same time Fox bought other properties such as MySpace, IGN and Scout.com.

Games

SimMatchup
The sites SimMatchup feature lets users pit any two teams against each other. The list of MLB teams goes back to the 1885, NFL football teams back to 1941, NHL hockey teams back to 1917, NBA basketball teams back to 1950, and NCAA basketball teams goes back to different years depending on the team. All simulators produce complete box scores and full play-by-play.

SimLeagues
The sites SimLeagues lets users draft their own teams consisting of any player in MLB, NBA, NFL and NHL history and join leagues with other people. All leagues play full seasons (by today's standards) with playoffs.  Complete stats are tracked for all players and teams.

Dynasty games
The site has dynasty games for college football, college basketball, soccer and baseball where the user manages a team of fictional players over the course of several seasons. The user controls roster management, game planning, and in the college dynasties can advance from Division III schools up to Division I schools. In those games they have real colleges, but not players. There are other people who are also in the world with you.

Forums and other features
The site offers extensive user forums for each of the major sports, along with more general discussions and a section called "The Pit" for trash talk and more mature themes. Generally, the most active forum is Baseball (Sim Baseball and Hardball Dynasty, along with MLB talk.) On August 14, 2007 a soccer forum was introduced to talk about all things soccer.

The site also offers a section called "Beyond the Box Score" which are a series of columns which contain weekly NFL projections on games and individual fantasy football performers, as well as explorations of various "what if" scenarios.  In March 2008, the simulator correctly predicted seven of the eight elite 8 teams, all Final Four teams, the runner-up Memphis and champion Kansas.

For a short period of time the site had a Legends Chat. Well-known coaches or athletes would receive questions from users.  The questions were screened and had to be submitted the day before the chat. There were only seven of these chats: Davey Johnson (11/28/06), Dan Reeves (12/5/06), Bobby Cremins (12/19/06), Jack Lengyel (1/23/07), John Robinson (2/1/07), John Chaney (2/14/07) and Jud Heathcote (3/7/07).

Controversy
Fox's acquisition of the site was controversial with some users. There was also a dispute involving copyright issues about Major League Baseball logos and player names and likenesses. When a lawsuit was filed by CDM Fantasy Sports against the Major League Baseball Players Association and Major League Baseball Advanced Media (MLB's new media unit) over the use of such material, WhatIfSports eliminated MLB logos and player names and images, substituting generic descriptions of the players. This move generated some controversy with users, though the player names were restored after a federal court decision in favor of CDM Fantasy Sports. The logos have not yet been restored due to continuing copyright concerns.

Notes and references

External links
 Whatifsports.com website

 Whatifsports.com Beyond the Boxscore column
 Whatifsports.com MySpace profile
 Bill Simmons' article on ESPN.com
 Neal Pollack's article in New York Times Magazine
Physorg.com story on WhatIfSports
Press release on 2005 Webby award
BurnsideWritersCollective.com story on WhatIfSports

American sport websites
Companies based in Cincinnati